Foto may refer to:
Fotö, an island and locality in Öckerö municipality, Västra Götaland county, Sweden
Foto language, a Bantu language of the Democratic Republic of Congo
Foto Strakosha (born 1965), an Albanian retired football goalkeeper
Foto Çami (born 1925), a former Albanian politician
To Lua Foto (died 614), Abbot of Clonmacnoise
Fot, sometimes known as Foto, a runemaster in mid-11th century Sweden
Forecasting Of Traffic Objects (FOTO), software tool for Three-phase traffic theory

See also
Photograph or photo, an image created by light falling on a light-sensitive surface
Fotos, a German indie rock band